The fourth season of Chicago Fire, an American drama television series with executive producer Dick Wolf, and producers Derek Haas, Michael Brandt, and Matt Olmstead, was ordered on February 5, 2015, by NBC, and premiered on October 13, 2015, and concluded on May 17, 2016. The season contained 23 episodes.

Overview
The show follows the lives of the firefighters and paramedics working at the Chicago Fire Department at the firehouse of Engine 51, Truck 81, Squad 3, Ambulance 61 and Battalion 25.

Cast and characters

Main cast
 Jesse Spencer as Lieutenant Matthew Casey, Truck 81
 Taylor Kinney as Firefighter/Lieutenant Kelly Severide, Squad 3
 Monica Raymund as Firefighter Gabriela Dawson, Truck 81
 Kara Killmer as Paramedic/Paramedic In Charge Sylvie Brett, Ambulance 61
 David Eigenberg as Firefighter Christopher Herrmann, Truck 81
 Yuri Sardarov as Firefighter Brian "Otis" Zvonecek, Truck 81
 Joe Minoso as Firefighter Joe Cruz, Squad 3
 Christian Stolte as Firefighter Randy "Mouch" McHolland, Truck 81
 Dora Madison as Paramedic in Charge/Paramedic Jessica "Chili" Chilton, Ambulance 61 (Episodes 1-14)
 Steven R. McQueen as Firefighter Candidate/Paramedic Jimmy Borelli, Truck 81/ Ambulance 61
 Eamonn Walker as Chief Wallace Boden, Battalion 25

Recurring
 The Cohen Twins (Aiden & Austin Cohen) as Louie
 Randy Flagler as Firefighter Harold Capp, Rescue Squad 3
 Anthony Ferraris as Firefighter Tony Ferraris, Rescue Squad 3
 DuShon Brown as Connie
 Brian J. White as Captain/Battalion Chief Dallas Patterson, Rescue Squad 3/ Firehouse 51/ Firehouse 90
 Miranda Rae Mayo as Firefighter Stella Kidd, Truck 81
 Treat Williams as Benjamin "Benny" Severide
 Melissa Ponzio as Donna Robbins-Boden
 Robyn Coffin as Cindy Herrmann
 Brandon Jay McLaren as Danny Booker
 Jenny Mollen as Detective Bianca Holloway
 Holly Robinson Peete as Tamara Jones
 Lauren Stamile as Susan Weller
 Guy Burnet as Grant Smith
 Gordon Clapp as Chaplain Orlovsky
 Liza J. Bennett as Agent Alex Ward
 Deanna Reed-Foster as Tina Cantrell, Department of Children and Family Services
 Rachel Nichols as Jamie Killian
 Fredric Lehne as Deputy District Chief Ray Riddle
 Tom Amandes as Detective Ryan Wheeler
 Ilfenesh Hadera as Serena Holmes
 Mark Hengst as Roger Maddox
 Ralph Rodriguez as Freddie Clemente
 Susannah Flood as Athena Bailey-Johnson
 Andy Ahrens as Firefighter Danny Borelli, Engine 67
 Eric Mabius as Jack Nesbitt

Crossover characters
 Nick Gehlfuss as Dr. Will Halstead
 Jason Beghe as Sergeant Henry "Hank" Voight
 Jon Seda as Detective Antonio Dawson
 Oliver Platt as Dr. Daniel Charles
 Yaya DaCosta as April Sexton
 Patrick John Flueger as Officer Adam Ruzek
 LaRoyce Hawkins as Officer Kevin Atwater
 Marina Squerciati as Officer Kim Burgess
 Amy Morton as Desk Sergeant Trudy Platt
 Brian Geraghty as Officer Sean Roman
 Elias Koteas as Detective Alvin Olinsky
 Colin Donnell as Dr. Connor Rhodes
 Rachel DiPillo as Sarah Reese
 Brian Tee as Dr. Ethan Choi
 Marlyne Barrett as Maggie Lockwood
 Samuel Hunt as Greg "Mouse" Gerwitz
 Barbara Eve Harris as Deputy Chief Emma Crowley
 Chris Agos as Assistant State's Attorney Steve Kot
 Armand Schultz as Alderman Colin Becks

Episodes

Ratings

Home media
The DVD release of season four was released in Region 1 on August 30, 2016.

References

External links

2015 American television seasons
2016 American television seasons
Chicago Fire (TV series) seasons